The C 5/6 were a class of steam locomotives in use for the Swiss Federal Railways. 28 of them were built between 1913 and 1917; all had been withdrawn by 1968. Four have been preserved, one of them in working order. The class was designed for use on the steep inclines of the Gotthard route, and was considered extremely efficient, earning the nickname Elephant. Its design was based on the successful C 4/5 locomotive, and the result is the largest steam locomotive operated by the Swiss Federal Railways. Within a few years of introduction, however, they began to be replaced by new electric locomotives.

Preservation
Number 2978, built in 1917, was the last steam locomotive built for Swiss Federal Railways, and is now part of the company's heritage fleet. In 1960, number 2978 was fitted with the boiler of number 2956.
Number 2969, built in 1915, was restored & returned to service on 20 October 2017 by Eurovapor in Sulgen https://lapassiondutrain.blogspot.com/2017/10/suisse-remise-en-service-de-la-c-56.html They also have the number 2958 for spare parts (which was earlier in Olten) and will preserve it as an exhibit.
Number 2965, not in working order, is an exhibit in the Swiss Transport Museum in Lucerne.

See also
 List of stock used by Swiss Federal Railways

References

External links 

 C 5/6 2978 CFF-Historic (French / German)

2-10-0 locomotives
C 5 6
Steam locomotives of Switzerland
Preserved steam locomotives of Switzerland
SLM locomotives
Standard gauge locomotives of Switzerland